The name Ann has been used for four tropical cyclones worldwide – three in the western North Pacific Ocean, and one in the Australian region of the South Pacific.

In the western North Pacific:

 Tropical Storm Ann (1945)
 Tropical Storm Ann (1996) (T9602, 02W, Biring), minimal impact in the Philippines.
 Tropical Storm Ann (1999) (T9917, 23W), approached the coast of China to the north of Shanghai, then crossed the Yellow Sea before dissipating near South Korea.

In the Australian region:

 Cyclone Ann (2019) – an off-season tropical cyclone that reached Category 2 intensity on the Australian scale before making landfall in Far North Queensland as a tropical low.
After the 2018-19 season, the name Ann was removed from the Australian name list.

See also 
 List of storms named Anne

Pacific typhoon set index articles